Kutuyevo (Qotoy) is a rural locality (a village) in Urazovsky Selsoviet, Uchalinsky District, Bashkortostan, Russia. The population was 230 as of 2010. There are 3 streets.

Geography 
Kutuyevo is located 37 km southwest of Uchaly (the district's administrative centre) by road. Ishmekeyevo is the nearest rural locality.

References 

Rural localities in Uchalinsky District